German submarine U-19 was a Type IIB U-boat of Nazi Germany's Kriegsmarine during World War II. Her keel was laid down on 20 July 1935, at the Germaniawerft of Kiel. She was launched on 21 December 1935, and commissioned on 16 January 1936, under the command of Kapitänleutnant Viktor Schütze.

U-19 conducted 20 patrols, sinking 15 ships totalling  and 441 tons. On 1 May 1940, U-19 was withdrawn from combat duty and used for training and as a school boat. She returned to active duty in the 30th U-boat Flotilla on 1 May 1942, after having been transported overland and along the Danube to the Black Sea.

Design
German Type IIB submarines were enlarged versions of the original Type IIs. U-19 had a displacement of  when at the surface and  while submerged. She had two shafts and two  propellers.

U-19 was fitted with three  torpedo tubes at the bow, five torpedoes or up to twelve Type A torpedo mines, and a  anti-aircraft gun. The boat had a complement of twentyfive.

Operational history

First, second and third patrols
U-19s first three patrols involved voyages between Wilhelmshaven and Kiel via the North Sea. She also carried out a series of short journeys, one of which took her to the English east coast near The Wash.

Fourth and fifth patrols

U-19 departed Wilhelmshaven on 4 January 1940. On the ninth, she sank Manx north of Kinnaird Head, near Fraserburgh in Scotland. She docked in Kiel on the 12th.

Sixth to ninth patrols

A steady stream of sinkings followed, including Charkow on 19 March 1940 and Bothal on the 20th.

The boat was then transported in sections along the Danube to the Romanian port of Galați. She was then re-assembled by the Romanians at the Galați shipyard and sent to the Black Sea.

Tenth patrol
She departed the Romanian port of Constanța (where she was to be based for the rest of her career), on 21 January 1943. She was attacked by four unidentified aircraft off Gelendzhik on 13 February; damage was minimal.

11th and 12th patrols
This foray was cut short on 27 March 1943 because of problems with the starboard engine.

A crewman fell sick between Tuapse and Poti. He was transferred to Schnellboot S-51 off Novorossiysk on 28 April 1943.

13th patrol
This sortie was officially divided into three parts. Having left Constanța on 10 June 1943, she returned on the 11th due to a defective exhaust valve, having first re-fuelled at Feodosia.

Part two was the longest, starting from Constanța on 16 June and finishing in Feodosia on 7 July.

The third portion was little more than a movement exercise from Feodosia to Constanța which only lasted two days.

14th patrol
Patrol number fourteen was also divided. U-19 put into Feodosia to re-supply.

This activity was cut short for U-19 because of problems with the periscope.

15th-19th patrols
These sorties covered most of the Black Sea but were relatively uneventful.

20th patrol
U-19 departed Constanța on 25 August 1944. She sank the Soviet minesweeper BTSC-410 Vzryv (No 25) on 2 September. The communist regime cited this incident as the reason that the Romanian fleet was seized. The commander was wounded in an accident on the seventh. The First Watch Officer (1WO) took over.

Fate
The boat was scuttled in the Black Sea off the coast of Turkey on 10 September 1944. U-19 suffered no casualties to any of her crew.

On 3 February 2008, The Daily Telegraph newspaper reported that U-20 and U-23 had been discovered by Selçuk Kolay, a Turkish marine engineer. He thinks he is also close to pinpointing U-19, thought to lie more than  down, three miles from the Turkish city of Zonguldak.

Summary of raiding history

References

Notes

Citations

Bibliography

External links

German Type II submarines
U-boats commissioned in 1936
U-boats scuttled in 1944
World War II submarines of Germany
World War II shipwrecks in the Black Sea
1935 ships
Ships built in Kiel
Ships built in Romania
Military units and formations of Nazi Germany in the Spanish Civil War
Maritime incidents in September 1944